Claude Georges Itzykson, (11 April 1938 – 22 May 1995) was a French theoretical physicist who worked in quantum field theory and statistical mechanics.

Biography
Separated from his parents by World War II, his father was taken to a Nazi concentration camp and Itzykson is raised in a Jewish orphanage in Maisons-Laffitte. After studying at the Lycée Condorcet Itzykson graduated from the Ecole Polytechnique in 1959. He joined the Theoretical Physics Department of the CEA in Saclay in 1962, then headed by Claude Bloch. He spent most of his career at Saclay, except for numerous visiting positions he held throughout his working life, such as at the Institute for Advanced Study, Princeton.

Works
He was a specialist in quantum field theory and applications of group theory in physics. In particular, he worked on the symmetries of the hydrogen atom, the discretization of network gauge theories, the integrals on large matrices and their applications to problems of combinatorics and physics of random surfaces, and conformal field theories and their classification.

His first works were done in collaboration with Maurice Jacob and Raymond Stora. In 1980 he published a treatise on quantum field theory with Jean-Bernard Zuber that became a staple textbook on the subject.

Awards
In 1995 Itzykson received the Ampère Prize of the French Academy of Sciences.

Bibliography

Textbooks

Selected publications

References

1938 births
1995 deaths
20th-century French physicists
Quantum physicists
Theoretical physicists
Mathematical physicists
École Polytechnique alumni
Members of the Académie Française
Members of the French Academy of Sciences
Scientists from Paris